Pioneer Square South and Pioneer Square North are a pair of light rail stations in Portland, Oregon, United States, served by TriMet as part of the MAX Light Rail system. Situated directly west of the Portland Transit Mall on the perimeter of Pioneer Courthouse Square in downtown Portland, facing Yamhill and Morrison streets between Broadway and 6th Avenue, the pair are the 21st and 7th stations eastbound on the Blue Line and the Red Line, respectively. They consist of one side platform each as MAX operates in a one-way pair along this segment; trains traveling eastbound stop at Pioneer Square South while trains traveling westbound stop at Pioneer Square North. With connections to the Green, Orange, and Yellow lines, the Pioneer Square stations, along with the Pioneer Courthouse/Southwest 6th and Pioneer Place/Southwest 5th stations located one block east, mark the only transfer point in the MAX system where riders can board any of the five existing lines.

The Pioneer Square stations are among the 27 original stations of the Banfield Light Rail Project, which built the Metropolitan Area Express (MAX), Portland's first light rail line. They opened along with the inaugural service of MAX on September 5, 1986. The stations are currently served by the Blue Line, which operates between Hillsboro and Gresham, and the Red Line, which operates between Beaverton and Portland International Airport. The Yellow Line had served the stations from May 2004 until that line's rerouting to the Portland Transit Mall in August 2009.

Location

The Pioneer Square stations occupy the sidewalks facing Yamhill and Morrison streets between Broadway and 6th Avenue in downtown Portland, on the perimeter of Pioneer Courthouse Square. The square, commonly referred to as "Portland's Living Room", is situated on a  city block in the center of downtown. It features several pieces of artwork, including the Waterfall Fountain, a water feature built of granite, and the Weather Machine and Allow Me sculptures. Oregon's first Starbucks outlet sits on the northwest corner of the square, while a news television studio for KGW called "Studio on the Square" occupies the southeast corner. Neighboring office towers include the American Bank Building to the north and the Jackson Tower and 6Y building to the south. Nordstrom Downtown Portland occupies the block to the west.

History

The downtown city block bound by Morrison and Yamhill streets to the north and south and 6th Avenue and Broadway to the east and west had previously been occupied by various structures, from the city's first public school, to the Portland Hotel, to a two-story parking garage. In 1969, block owner Meier & Frank requested a permit to construct an 800-car parking garage at the site, which the Portland City Council rejected amid a series of heated public hearings. The controversial proposal led the city and local businesses to pursue a comprehensive downtown plan that envisioned turning the site into a public space instead. After negotiating with Meier & Frank, the city purchased the property and in 1980, announced a national design competition for a plaza that would be called "Pioneer Courthouse Square".

Portland's first light rail line, which planners referred to as the Banfield Light Rail Project, received federal approval for construction in September 1980. Just over a year later, TriMet published a conceptual design report of the project that outlined a 27-station,  line, including a pair of light rail stations at Pioneer Courthouse Square. The plans called for a pair of platforms along the north and south ends of the square on Morrison and Yamhill streets. Construction of the line commenced in April 1983 in Gresham and largely progressed from east to west, with the downtown segment among the final sections to be completed. Street and sidewalk reconstruction work finally reached downtown in March the following year. While work continued on the line, the city finished building the square and dedicated it on April 6, 1984. By March 1986, major light rail construction work had ceased. Line testing in downtown began with the arrival of the first light rail car two months later.

On September 5, 1986, the light rail line, which TriMet officially named the Metropolitan Area Express (MAX), opened to the public. A three-day celebration took place across the route, including at Pioneer Courthouse Square, which hosted an opening ceremony and several concerts. Over 3,000 people gathered at the square to welcome the 11:45 am arrival of the first train from Gresham. Until 1998, MAX only ran from 11th Avenue in downtown Portland to Cleveland Avenue in central Gresham, with a stop at the Pioneer Square stations. In September 1998, TriMet extended MAX service farther west to Hatfield Government Center in downtown Hillsboro in Washington County with the opening of the Westside MAX extension. Three years later, the Red Line became the second line to serve the Pioneer Square stations following the opening of the Airport MAX extension, which introduced an airport rail link between downtown Portland and Portland International Airport. The original service between Hillsboro and Gresham was subsequently renamed the Blue Line. In September 2003, TriMet extended the Red Line westward to Beaverton Transit Center. From 2004 to 2009, the Yellow Line, which runs to the Expo Center in North Portland, also stopped at these stations until TriMet rerouted it to the light rail tracks on Portland Transit Mall in August 2009.

Station details

Each station comprises one side platform as MAX operates in a one-way pair along the Yamhill–Morrison segment. Pioneer Courthouse Square is situated between the two platforms. Amenities include ticket vending machines, garbage cans, shelters, and schedule information displays. TriMet's ticket office is located inside the visitor information center on the west side of the square between the Waterfall Fountain. Fares may be purchased at the ticket office or from ticket vending machines on the platforms.

Service

The Pioneer Square stations are served by two MAX lines: the MAX Blue Line, which operates from Hatfield Government Center station in Hillsboro in the west to Cleveland Avenue station in Gresham in the east, and the MAX Red Line, which operates from Beaverton Transit Center in the west to Portland International Airport in the east. From the stations, westbound trains take approximately 25 minutes to reach Beaverton Transit Center and 50 minutes to reach Hatfield Government Center station. Eastbound trains take approximately 35 minutes to reach Portland International Airport station and 50minutes to reach Cleveland Avenue station. The stations together recorded an average 5,123 riders on weekdays in fall 2019.

TriMet considers the Pioneer Courthouse Square vicinity a transit hub. It is the only point in the MAX system where all five existing light rail services interconnect. The northbound light rail tracks on the Portland Transit Mall run along the immediate east side of the Pioneer Square station platforms on 6th Avenue; this provides a transfer to the MAX platform of Pioneer Courthouse/Southwest 6th station across the street, served by the Green and Yellow lines. On the opposite end of this adjacent block, which is occupied by the Pioneer Courthouse, is the southbound MAX station, Pioneer Place/Southwest 5th; this station is served by the Green and Orange lines.

The Pioneer Square stations also facilitate transfers to TriMet and C-Tran buses serving the Portland Transit Mall, including a future connection to FX–Division via stops 5th and Salmon and 6th and Taylor.

References

External links

 
 

1986 establishments in Oregon
MAX Blue Line
MAX Light Rail double stations
MAX Red Line
Railway stations in Portland, Oregon
Railway stations in the United States opened in 1986
Southwest Portland, Oregon